β-Nitropropionic acid (3-nitropropanoic acid, BPA, 3-NPA) is a mycotoxin, a potent mitochondrial inhibitor, which is toxic to humans. It is produced by a number of fungi, and may be found widely in food such as in sugar cane as well as Japanese fungally fermented staples, including miso, soy sauce, katsuobushi, coconuts and some traditional Chinese medicines.

It can be caused by extreme weather, stressed crop growth conditions, as well as storage conditions (like moisture), which can give a further rise under global warming conditions.
Arthrinium caricicola produces the toxin 3-nitropropanoic acid.

It is found that 3-nitropropionic acid is a mitochondrial toxin and produces striatal alterations in rats similar to those observed in the brain of Huntington’s disease patients, and administration of the cannabinoid receptor agonist WIN55212-2 to rats for six consecutive days, before the 3-NPA injection, exerted preventive effects on all alterations elicited by the toxin, like mitochondrial dysfunction and lipid peroxidation, by activation of the CB1 receptor.

References

External
 3-Nitropropionic Acid Is a Suicide Inhibitor of Mitochondrial Respiration J. Biol. Chem. 2006, 281:5965-5972

Propionic acids
Mycotoxins
Nitro compounds